Carnegieodoxa is a genus of flowering plants belonging to the family Monimiaceae.

Its native range is New Caledonia.

Species:

Carnegieodoxa eximia

References

Monimiaceae
Monimiaceae genera